Ralph Green (birth unknown – death unknown) was a Welsh professional rugby league footballer who played in the 1930s. He sometimes is erroneously referred to as Roger Green.

International honours
Green won a cap for Wales while at Leeds in 1933 against Australia.

References

Leeds Rhinos players
Place of birth missing
Rugby league locks
Wales national rugby league team players
Welsh rugby league players
Year of birth missing
Place of death missing
Year of death missing